Jun Misawa ( Misawa Jun; 1 October 1952 – 3 March 2022) was a Japanese baseball player and politician.

A member of the New Frontier Party, the Liberal Party, and the New Conservative Party, he served in the House of Representatives from 1996 to 2000.

Misawa died in Nagoya on 3 March 2022, at the age of 69.

References

1952 births
2022 deaths
20th-century Japanese politicians
21st-century Japanese politicians
Japanese baseball players
Chunichi Dragons players
Hokkaido Nippon-Ham Fighters players
Japanese baseball coaches
Japanese sportsperson-politicians
Members of the House of Representatives (Japan)
Members of the House of Representatives from Aichi Prefecture
New Frontier Party (Japan) politicians
Liberal Party (Japan, 1998) politicians
New Conservative Party (Japan) politicians
Baseball people from Shimane Prefecture
Politicians from Shimane Prefecture